Päivi Marja Hannele Huovi, married name Eskola (b. 19 March 1949), is a Finnish writer and recipient of the Eino Leino Prize in 2009.

She was born in the city of Kotka, and is known mostly for her children's books and teen books.

References

Finnish writers
Recipients of the Eino Leino Prize
1949 births
Living people